Soudal–Quick-Step Devo Team is a Belgian UCI Continental team founded in 2015. The team gained UCI Continental status in 2022. Since  2023, the team has acted as the development team for UCI WorldTeam .

Team roster

References

External links

UCI Continental Teams (Europe)
Cycling teams based in Belgium
Cycling teams established in 2015